Senezh, also known as Senezhskoye (Сенежское), is a lake in Moscow Oblast, Russia, about 60 km northwest of Moscow. Area: 7 km². The town of Solnechnogorsk is located on its western coast. The Sestra River starts from here.

Lakes of Moscow Oblast